Lauterborn is a German surname. Notable people with the surname include:

Bill Lauterborn (1879–1965), American baseball player
Peter Lauterborn (born 1984), American activist
Robert Lauterborn (1869–1952), German botanist, limnologist and protozoologist

See also
Offenbach-Lauterborn, a borough of Offenbach am Main, Germany

German-language surnames